Asiab or Asiyab or Asyab, meaning mill, may refer to the places:
 Asiab-e Kereshki, Fars Province
 Asiab-e Saran, Gilan Province
 Asiab Darreh, Gilan Province
 Asiab Sham, Gilan Province
 Asiab, Hormozgan
 Asiyab-e Kohneh, Isfahan Province
 Asiyab-e Alikhan, Kerman Province
 Asiyab-e Mir Naser, Kerman Province
 Asiab-e Shah Teymur, Kerman Province
 Asiyab Ostad, Kerman Province
 Asiyab-e Qazi, Kerman Province
 Asiab-e Tanureh, Kermanshah Province
 Asiab, Masjed Soleyman, Khuzestan Province
 Asiab, Omidiyeh, Khuzestan Province
 Asiyab-e Shekasteh, Khuzestan Province
 Asiab Rural District, in Omidiyeh County, Khuzestan Province
 Asiab, Kurdistan
 Asiab Barq, Kurdistan Province
 Asiab Kikhosrow, Kurdistan Province
 Asyab Qashqa, Razavi Khorasan Province
 Tepe Asiab, a neolithic archaeological site (-8000 BC) in the Zagros Mountains, near Kermanshah, Iran